The Dortmund Data Bank (short DDB) is a factual data bank for thermodynamic and thermophysical data. Its main usage is the data supply for process simulation where experimental data are the basis for the design, analysis, synthesis, and optimization of chemical processes. The DDB is used for fitting parameters for thermodynamic models like NRTL  or UNIQUAC and for many different equations describing pure component properties, e.g., the Antoine equation for vapor pressures. The DDB is also used for the development and revision of predictive methods like UNIFAC and PSRK.

Contents

Mixture properties

 Phase equilibria data (vapor–liquid, liquid–liquid, solid–liquid), data on azeotropy and zeotropy
 Mixing enthalpies
 Gas solubilities
 Activity coefficients at infinite dilution
 Heat capacities and excess heat capacities
 Volumes, densities, and excess volumes (volume effect of mixing)
 Salt solubilities
 Octanol-water partition coefficients
 Critical data

The mixture data banks contain approx. 308,000 data sets with 2,157,000 data points for 10,750 components building 84,870 different binary, ternary, and higher systems/combinations.

Pure component properties 

 Saturated vapor pressures
 Saturated densities
 Viscosities
 Thermal conductivities
 Critical data (Tc, Pc, Vc)
 Triple points 
 Melting points
 Heat capacities
 Heats of fusion, sublimation and vaporization
 Heats of formation and combustion
 Heats and temperatures of transitions for solids
 Speed of sound
 P-v-T data including virial coefficients
 Energy functions
 Enthalpies and entropies
 Surface tensions

The pure component properties data bank contains approx. 157,000 data sets with 1,080,000 data points for 16,700 different components.

Data sources
The DDB is a collection of experimental data published by the original authors. All data are referenced and a quite large literature data bank is part of the DDB, currently containing more than 92,000 articles, books, private communications, deposited documents from Russia (VINITI), the Ukraine (Ukrniiti) and other former USSR states, company reports (mainly from former GDR companies), theses, patents, and conference contributions.

Secondary sources like data collections are normally neglected and only used as a literature source. Derived data are also not collected with the main exception of the azeotropic data bank which is built partly from evaluated vapor–liquid equilibrium data.

History
The Dortmund Data Bank was founded in the 1970s at the University of Dortmund in Germany. The original reason for starting a vapor–liquid phase equilibria data collection was the development of the group contribution method UNIFAC which allows to estimate vapor pressures of mixtures.

The DDB has since been extended to many other properties and has increased dramatically in size also because of intensive (German) government aid. The funding has ended and the further development and maintenance is performed by DDBST GmbH, a company founded by members of the industrial chemistry chair of the Carl von Ossietzky University of Oldenburg, Germany.

Additional contributors are the DECHEMA, the FIZ CHEMIE (Berlin), the Technical University in Tallinn, and others.

Availability
The Dortmund Data Bank is distributed by DDBST GmbH as in-house software. Many parts of the Dortmund Data Bank are also distributed as part of the DETHERM data bank which is also available online.

See also
Beilstein database
Elektrolytdatenbank Regensburg

References

External links
DDBST GmbH
DDB Online Search
DECHEMA
Topological Analysis of the Gibbs Energy Function (Liquid-Liquid Equilibrium Correlation Data). Including a Thermodinamic Review and a Graphical User Interface (GUI) for Surfaces/Tie-lines/Hessian matrix analysis - University of Alicante

Thermodynamics
Chemical databases
Technical University of Dortmund
University of Oldenburg